Time is a 1999 Indian Tamil-language drama film directed by Geetha Krishna. The film stars Prabhu Deva, Simran and Radhika Chaudhry. The film's score and soundtrack were composed by Ilaiyaraaja.

Cast

Prabhu Deva as Srinivasa Murthy
Simran as Thulasi
Radhika Chaudhry as Priya
Babloo Prithiveeraj as Dhilip
Charle as Chittappa, Srinivasa Murthy's friend
Manivannan as Appasamy
Nassar as Govindarajan, Thulasi's father
Moulee as Natarajan
Devan as Seetharaman, Dhilip's father
Bobby Poonia as David
Pandu as Priya's father
Vaiyapuri as Servant
Thadi Balaji as Srinivasa Murthy's friend
Ambika as Srinivasa Murthy's mother
Kovai Sarala as Natarajan's wife
Sabitha Anand as Dhilip's mother
Chandra Mohan as Car driver
J. V. Ramana Murthi as Shop owner
Raviraj as Govindarajan's friend
Kallu Chidambaram as Postman
Sharmili as Priya's mother
Radhabhai as Dhilip's grandmother
Bhanusri as Servant
Lekhasri
Manga Reddy as Lakshmi, Thulasi's mother
Dubbing Janaki as Chittappa's mother
Baby Jennifer as Priya's sister
Master Bharathkumar as Thulasi's brother
Sahadevan as Postman
Mahadevan as Postman
Harikumar as Srinivasa Murthy's friend
Gopi as Srinivasa Murthy's friend
Johnny as Srinivasa Murthy's friend
Ajay as Srinivasa Murthy's friend
Krishna as Srinivasa Murthy's friend
Anandaraj as Local don (guest appearance)

Production
The film marked the directorial debut of Geetha Krishna in Tamil, and began as a quadrilingual venture in Tamil, Hindi, Telugu and Malayalam. Prashanth was initially announced as the hero in the film as early as November 1997 when the movie launch took place. Prashanth started working for the film in Kodaikanal during October 1998 but later backed out, while Ajith Kumar also refused the film due to lack of time. After several delays, 
Prabhu Deva was subsequently selected to play the lead role and the film was made only in Tamil. Two debutant actresses were announced to portray the lead female roles, Menaka Senail and Radhika Chaudhari, though the former was later replaced by Simran. Model Bobbu Poonai made his acting debut as the antagonist.

Music
The songs were composed by Ilaiyaraaja and lyrics were written by Pazhani Bharathi. To compose the songs, Ilayaraaja and Geetha Krishna, had gone on a recce to Maldives and had longlisted thirty songs for the film, before picking six.

Reception
The film received negative reviews from critics. BBThots wrote the film "has Ilaiyaraja's music and good photography. But inept direction and a muddled screenplay make a mess of the already flimsy story". Thiraipadam wrote "The ending is implausible, the storyline weak, but you can watch it once, I guess, if you have the time (no pun intended) and if you're an avid lover of Tamil movies." New Straits Times wrote the film has shades of Kadhal Kottai "the story gets a little muddled in the end".

Legacy 
The song "Kadhal Neethana" was played in a commercially successful film Love Today (2022 film), as the main character Uthaman Pradeep's (Pradeep Ranganathan) ringtone.

References

1999 films
Films scored by Ilaiyaraaja
1990s Tamil-language films
Indian romantic drama films
Films shot in Visakhapatnam
Films shot in Kerala
Films shot in Singapore
1999 romantic drama films